Australia was the host nation for the 2000 Summer Olympics in Sydney.  Australian athletes have competed in every Summer Olympic Games. 617 competitors, 341 men and 276 women, took part in 270 events in 34 sports.

Medalists

Archery

Australia won its first Olympic gold medal, and moreover the first Olympic medal of any color, in the sport of archery in Sydney. Simon Fairweather defeated all six archers he faced, including a comfortable seven-point victory in the final.

Men

Women

Athletics

Key
Note–Ranks given for track events are within the athlete's heat only
Q = Qualified for the next round
q = Qualified for the next round as a fastest loser or, in field events, by position without achieving the qualifying target
NR = National record
N/A = Round not applicable for the event
Bye = Athlete not required to compete in round

Men
Track and road events

Field events

Combined events – Decathlon

Women
Track and road events

Field events

Combined events – Heptathlon

Badminton

Men

Women

Mixed

Baseball

Men's tournament
The Australians' second appearance in the Olympic baseball tournament resulted in the team moving up one place in the rankings, from seventh to sixth. They defeated Korea and South Africa but lost to the five other teams in competition to finish outside the top four and find themselves eliminated after the preliminaries.
Team roster

Craig Anderson
Grant Balfour
Tom Becker
Shayne Bennett
Mathew Buckley
Adam Burton
Clayton Byrne
Mark Ettles
Paul Gonzalez
Mark Hutton
Ronny Johnson
Grant McDonald
Adrian Meagher
Michael Moyle
Michael Nakamura
David Nilsson
Glenn Reeves
Brett Roneberg
Chris Snelling
Brad Thomas
Rodney van Buizen
David White
Gary White
Glenn Williams
Head coach: Jon Deeble

Basketball

Men's team roster
 Andrew Gaze (captain)
 Chris Anstey
 Mark Bradtke
 Martin Cattalini
 Ricky Grace
 Shane Heal
 Luc Longley
 Sam Mackinnon
 Brett Maher
 Paul Rogers
 Jason Smith
 Andrew Vlahov
Head coach: Barry Barnes

Women's team roster
Sandy Brondello
Michelle Brogan
Carla Boyd
Jo Hill
Kristi Harrower
Shelly Sandie
Annie la Fleur
Trisha Fallon
Lauren Jackson
Rachael Sporn
Michele Timms
Jenny Whittle
Head coach: Tom Maher

Teams' results

Beach volleyball

Men

Boxing

Canoeing

Slalom

Sprint
Men

Women

Cycling

Cross country

Road cycling
Men

Women

Track cycling
Pursuit

Sprint

Time trial

Points race

Keirin

Diving

Australia entered divers in all of the events, and won two bronze medals.

Men

Women

Equestrian

Fencing

Seven fencers, five men and two women, represented Australia in 2000.
Men

Women

Football

Men's tournament

Coach: Raul Blanco

 *Over-aged player
Group stage

Women's tournament
Team roster

Dianne Alagich
Sharon Black
Bryony Duus
Alicia Ferguson
Alison Forman (captain)
Heather Garriock
Kelly Golebiowski
Peita-Claire Hepperlin
Sunni Hughes
Kate McShea
Julie Murray
Cheryl Salisbury
Bridgette Starr
Anissa Tann
Leanne Trimboli
Sacha Wainwright
Tracey Wheeler
Amy Wilson
Head coach: Chris Tanzey

Group stage

Gymnastics

Men's artistic

Women's artistic
Team

Individual events

Handball

Men's team roster
Peter Bach
Christian Bajan
Vernon Cheung
Russell Garnett
David Gonzalez
Kristian Groenintwoud
Darryl McCormack
Rajan Pavlovic
Taip Ramadani
Brendon Taylor 
Lee Schofield
Dragan Sestic
Sasa Sestic
Milan Slavujevic
Karim Shehab
Head coach: Zoltán Marczinka

Women's team roster
Janni Bach
Petra Besta
Rina Bjarnason
Raelene Boulton
Kim Briggs
Mari Edland
Sarah Hammond
Fiona Hannan
Vera Ignjatovic
Jana Jamnicky
Lydia Kahmke
Marina Kopcalic
Jovana Milosevic
Shelley Ormes
Katrina Shinfield
Head coach: Christoph Mecker

Teams' results

Field hockey

Men's team roster
 Michael Brennan
 Adam Commens
 Stephen Davies
 Damon Diletti (gk)
 Lachlan Dreher (gk)
 Jason Duff
 Troy Elder
 James Elmer
 Paul Gaudoin
 Stephen Holt
 Brent Livermore
 Daniel Sproule
 Jay Stacy
 Craig Victory
 Matthew Wells
 Michael York
Head Coach: Terry Walsh

Women's team roster
 Kate Allen
 Alyson Annan
 Renita Farrell
 Juliet Haslam
 Rechelle Hawkes
 Nikki Hudson
 Rachel Imison (gk)
 Clover Maitland (gk)
 Claire Mitchell-Taverner
 Jenn Morris
 Alison Peek
 Katrina Powell
 Lisa Powell
 Angie Skirving
 Kate Starre
 Julie Towers
Head Coach: Ric Charlesworth

Results

Judo

Men

Women

Modern pentathlon

Coaches: Anthony Klarica, John Olsen, John Gilman, Scott Arnold, Russel Johnston

Rhythmic gymnastics

Rowing

Men

Women

Sailing

Australia competed in all of the sailing events at the 2000 Olympics. They won 2 golds, 1 silver and 1 bronze.

Men

Men's Double Handed Dinghy (470)
Tom King and Mark Turnbull
 Race 1 — 5
 Race 2 — 1
 Race 3 — 2 
 Race 4 — (14)
 Race 5 — 7 
 Race 6 — 10
 Race 7 — 8
 Race 8 — 1
 Race 9 — 2
 Race 10 — (11)
 Race 11 — 2
 Final — 38 (gold medal)

Men's Laser
Michael Blackburn
 Race 1 — 8
 Race 2 — 9
 Race 3 — 2
 Race 4 — (18)
 Race 5 — 6
 Race 6 — 5
 Race 7 — (22)
 Race 8 — 2
 Race 9 — 12
 Race 10 — 3
 Race 11 — 14
 Final — 60 (bronze medal)

Men's Tornado
Darren Bundock and John Forbes
 Race 1 — 1
 Race 2 — 3
 Race 3 — 4
 Race 4 — 4
 Race 5 — 4
 Race 6 — (7)
 Race 7 — 2
 Race 8 — 4
 Race 9 — (5)
 Race 10 — 2
 Race 11 — 1
 Final — 25 (silver medal)

Men's Two Handed Keelboat (Star)
Colin Beashel and David Giles
 Race 1 — 8
 Race 2 — 8
 Race 3 — 6
 Race 4 — 1
 Race 5 — 3
 Race 6 — 2
 Race 7 — 8
 Race 8 — 9
 Race 9 — (17) DSQ
 Race 10 — (12)
 Race 11 — 6
 Final — 51 (7th place)

Men's Three Handed Keelboat (Soling)
Neville Wittey, Josh Grace and David Edwards
 Round Robin Group 2 1-4 (5th place — did not advance)

Women's Mistral
Jessica Crisp
 Race 1 — 13
 Race 2 — (15)
 Race 3 — 4
 Race 4 — 4
 Race 5 — 9
 Race 6 — 8
 Race 7 — 4
 Race 8 — (16)
 Race 9 — 3
 Race 10 — 4
 Race 11 — 10
 Final — 59 (5th place)

Women's Single Handed Dinghy (Europe)
Melanie Dennison
 Race 1 — 18
 Race 2 — 17
 Race 3 — 7
 Race 4 — (28) OCS
 Race 5 — (19)
 Race 6 — 10
 Race 7 — 19
 Race 8 — 8
 Race 9 — 3
 Race 10 — 4
 Race 11 — 16
 Final — 102 (15th place)

Women's Double Handed Dinghy (470)
Jenny Armstrong and Belinda Stowell
 Race 1 — 1
 Race 2 — (11)
 Race 3 — (18)
 Race 4 — 5
 Race 5 — 8
 Race 6 — 7
 Race 7 — 1
 Race 8 — 6
 Race 9 — 3
 Race 10 — 1
 Race 11 — 1
 Final — 33 (gold medal)

Mixed High Performance Two Handed Dinghy (49er)
Chris Nicholson and Daniel Phillips
 Race 1 — 11
 Race 2 — 11
 Race 3 — 1
 Race 4 — (14)
 Race 5 — 1
 Race 6 — 1
 Race 7 — 12
 Race 8 — 3
 Race 9 — 1
 Race 10 — 6
 Race 11 — (17)
 Race 12 — 10
 Race 13 — 8
 Race 14 — 5
 Race 15 — 9
 Race 16 — 7
 Final — 86 (6th place)

Shooting

Men

Women

Softball

Women's tournament
Preliminary Round
Defeated New Zealand (3-2)
Defeated Italy (7-0)
Defeated Canada (1-0)
Medal round
Lost to Japan (0-1)
Defeated United States (2-1)
Defeated PR China (1-0)
Defeated Cuba (8-1) →  Bronze medal
Team Roster
Sandra Allen
Joanne Brown
Kerry Dienelt
Peta Edebone
Sue Fairhurst
Selina Follas
Fiona Hanes
Kelly Hardie
Tanya Harding
Sally McCreedy
Simmone Morrow
Melanie Roche
Natalie Titcume
Natalie Ward
Brooke Wilkins
Head coach: Bob Crudgington

Swimming

Australia was very successful in the swimming venue at the 2000 Olympics. They won 5 Gold, 9 Silver, and 4 Bronze medals. The biggest rivalry, both in the press and in the pool, was between the United States and Australia relay teams. In the 4 × 100 m relay, the Americans had won the event every time it had been contested. Australia was able to edge out the Americans by .19 seconds to win the gold medal. The Australians also set three world records. The 2000 Olympics also saw the emergence of Ian Thorpe as an Olympic champion in the Men's 400 m Freestyle.

Men

Women

Synchronized swimming

Table tennis

Men

Women

Taekwondo

Tennis

Men

Women

Trampolining

Triathlon

Volleyball

Men's team roster
David Beard
Ben Hardy
Dan Howard
Nathan Jakavicius
Steve Keir
Ben Loft
Spiros Marazios
Scott Newcomb
Dan Ronan
Hidde Van Beest
Russell Wentworth 
Mark Williams
Head coach: Stelio de Rocco

Women's team roster
Tamsin Barnett
Louise Bawden 
Sandi Bowen
Liz Brett
Majella Brown
Angela Clarke
Bea Daly
Renae Maycock
Christie Mokotupu
Priscilla Ruddle
Selina Scoble
Rachel White
Head coach: Brad Saindon

Results

Water polo

Men's team roster
Sean Boyd
Eddie Denis
Andriy Kovalenko
Daniel Marsden
Craig Miller
Tim Neesham
Mark Oberman
Rod Owen-Jones
Rafael Sterk
Nathan Thomas
Grant Waterman
Thomas Whalan
Gavin Woods  
Head coach: Don Cameron

Women's team roster
Naomi Castle
Joanne Fox
Bridgette Gusterson
Simone Hankin
Yvette Higgins
Kate Hooper
Bronwyn Mayer
Gail Miller
Melissa Mills
Debbie Watson
Liz Weekes
Danielle Woodhouse
Taryn Woods
Head coach: István Görgényi

Results

Weightlifting

Men

Women

Wrestling

Men's freestyle

Men's Greco-Roman

See also
 Australia at the 2000 Summer Paralympics
 Australia at the 1998 Commonwealth Games
 Australia at the 2002 Commonwealth Games

Notes

Wallechinsky, David (2004). The Complete Book of the Summer Olympics (Athens 2004 Edition). Toronto, Canada. . 
International Olympic Committee (2001). The Results. Retrieved 12 November 2005.
Sydney Organising Committee for the Olympic Games (2001). Official Report of the XXVII Olympiad Volume 1: Preparing for the Games. Retrieved 20 November 2005.
Sydney Organising Committee for the Olympic Games (2001). Official Report of the XXVII Olympiad Volume 2: Celebrating the Games. Retrieved 20 November 2005.
Sydney Organising Committee for the Olympic Games (2001). The Results. Retrieved 20 November 2005.
International Olympic Committee Web Site

References

Nations at the 2000 Summer Olympics
2000
Oly
Articles containing video clips